Geobacter is a genus of bacteria.  Geobacter species are anaerobic respiration bacterial species which have capabilities that make them useful in bioremediation. Geobacter was found to be the first organism with the ability to oxidize organic compounds and metals, including iron, radioactive metals, and petroleum compounds into environmentally benign carbon dioxide while using iron oxide or other available metals as electron acceptors. Geobacter species are also found to be able to respire upon a graphite electrode. They have been found in anaerobic conditions in soils and aquatic sediment.

History  
Geobacter metallireducens was first isolated by Derek Lovley in 1987 in sand sediment from the Potomac River in Washington D.C. The first strain was deemed strain GS-15.

Geobacter spp. and methanotrophs, such as Candidatus Methylomirabilis and Methylobacter, were highly abundant in samples from the 'Bean' and the 'Thorn North' ring, in Ontario, Canada.

Metabolic mechanisms  
For quite some time, it was thought that Geobacter species lacked c-cytochromes that can be utilized to reduce metal ions, hence it was assumed that they required direct physical contact in order to use metal ions as terminal electron acceptors (TEAs). The discovery of the highly conductive pili in Geobacter species, and the proposal of using them as biological nano-wires further strengthened this view. Nevertheless, recent discoveries have revealed that many Geobacter species, such as Geobacter uraniireducens, not only do not possess highly conductive pili, but also do not need direct physical contact in order to utilize the metal ions as TEAs, suggesting that there is a great variety of extracellular electron transport mechanisms among the Geobacter species. For example, one other way of transporting electrons is via a quinone-mediated electron shuttle, which is observed in Geobacter sulfurreducens.

Another observed metabolic phenomenon is the cooperation between Geobacter species, in which several species cooperate in metabolizing a mixture of chemicals that neither could process alone. Provided with ethanol and sodium fumarate, G. metallireducens broke down the ethanol, generating an excess of electrons that were passed to G. sulfurreducens via nanowires grown between them, enabling G. sulfurreducens to break down the fumarate ions. The nanowires are made of proteins with metal-like conductivity.

Applications

Biodegradation and bioremediation 
Geobacter'''s ability to consume oil-based pollutants and radioactive material with carbon dioxide as waste byproduct has been used in environmental clean-up for underground petroleum spills and for the precipitation of uranium out of groundwater. Geobacter degrade the material by creating electrically conductive pili between itself and the pollutant material, using it as an electron source.

Microbial biodegradation of recalcitrant organic pollutants is of great environmental significance and involves intriguing novel biochemical reactions. In particular, hydrocarbons and halogenated compounds have long been doubted to be anaerobically degradable, but the isolation of hitherto unknown anaerobic hydrocarbon-degrading and reductively dehalogenating bacteria documented these processes in nature. Novel biochemical reactions were discovered, enabling the respective metabolic pathways, but progress in the molecular understanding of these bacteria was slowed by the absence of genetic systems for most of them. However, several complete genome sequences later became available for such bacteria. The genome of the hydrocarbon degrading and iron-reducing species G. metallireducens (accession nr. NC_007517) was determined in 2008. The genome revealed the presence of genes for reductive dehalogenases, suggesting a wide dehalogenating spectrum. Moreover, genome sequences provided insights into the evolution of reductive dehalogenation and differing strategies for niche adaptation.Geobacter species are often the predominant organisms when extracellular electron transfer is an important bioremediation process in subsurface environments. Therefore, a systems biology approach to understanding and optimizing bioremediation with Geobacter species has been initiated with the ultimate goal of developing in silico models that can predict the growth and metabolism of Geobacter species under a diversity of subsurface conditions. The genomes of multiple Geobacter species have been sequenced. Detailed functional genomic/physiological studies on one species, G. sulfurreducens was conducted. Genome-based models of several Geobacter species that are able to predict physiological responses under different environmental conditions are available. Quantitative analysis of gene transcript levels during in situ uranium bioremediation demonstrated that it is possible to track in situ rates of metabolism and the in situ metabolic state of Geobacter in the subsurface.

 Biofilm conductivity 

Many Geobacter species, such as G. sulfureducens, are capable of creating thick networks of biofilms on microbial fuel cell anodes for extracellular electron transfer. Cytochromes within the biofilm associate with pili to form extracellular structures called nanowires, which facilitate extracellular electron transfer throughout the biofilm. These cytochromes accept electrons from the microorganisms as well as from other reduced cytochromes present in the biofilm.

Electric currents are produced when the transfer of these electrons to anodes is coupled to the oxidation of intracellular organic wastes. Previous research has proposed that the high conductivity of Geobacter biofilms can be used to power microbial fuel cells and to generate electricity from organic waste products. In particular, G. sulfureducens holds one of the highest records for microbial fuel cell current density that researchers have ever been able to measure in vitro. This ability can be attributed to biofilm conductivity, as highly conductive biofilms have been found to be positively correlated with high current densities in microbial fuel cells.

At the moment, the development of microbial fuel cells for power generation purposes is partly restricted by its inefficiency compared to other sources of power and an insufficient understanding of extracellular electron transfer. As such, many researchers are currently studying how we can utilize biofilm conductivity to our advantage to produce even higher current densities. Low pH environments have been found to change redox potentials, thus inhibiting electron transfer from microorganisms to cytochromes. In addition, biofilms have been found to become less conductive with decreasing temperature, although raising the temperature back up again can restore biofilm conductivity without any adverse effects. The presence of pili or flagella on Geobacter species has been found to increase electric current generation by enabling more efficient electron transfer. These different factors can be tweaked to produce maximum electricity and to optimize bioremediation in the future.

 Neuromorphic memristor 

In a University of Massachusetts Amherst study, a neuromorphic memory (memristor) utilized Geobacter biofilm cut into thin nanowire strands. The nanowire strands conduct a low voltage similar to that of a neurons in a human brain. In a paper co-authored by Derek Lovely, Jun Yao observed that his team can "modulate the conductivity, or the plasticity of the nanowire-memristor synapse so it can emulate biological components for brain-inspired computing....". The breakthrough observation came as they monitored voltage activity at a sub 1 volt level.

Phylogeny
The currently accepted taxonomy is based on the List of Prokaryotic names with Standing in Nomenclature (LPSN) and National Center for Biotechnology Information (NCBI)

 Popular culture Geobacter has become an icon for teaching about microbial electrogenesis and microbial fuel cells and has appeared in educational kits that are available for students and hobbyists. Geobacter is also used to generate electricity via electrode grid in Amazon, Peru.

 See also 
 Forest ring
 Shewanella''
 List of bacterial orders
 List of bacteria genera

References

External links 
 LPSN, Genus: Geobacter
 
 Microbial Biodegradation, Bioremediation and Biotransformation
 An electrifying solution

Thermodesulfobacteriota
Bacteria genera